Therapy is a mystery novel by American author Jonathan Kellerman. The novel is the 18th installment of the Alex Delaware series.

Synopsis
In Los Angeles, Gavin Quick and his girlfriend are shot dead inside their car, whilst the unidentified woman is also impaled on a metal spike. As he investigates, psychologist Alex Delaware comes up against Dr. Mary Lou Koppel, a celebrity therapist who once treated Gavin and now guards his personal files with fearsome intensity.

Characters in "Therapy"
Alex Delaware - Psychologist
Milo Sturgis - Police detective

References

External links
 Google books page

2004 American novels
Novels by Jonathan Kellerman
Novels set in Los Angeles
Ballantine Books books